Cánepa is a surname. Notable people with the surname include:

Diego Cánepa (disambiguation), multiple people
Carlos Cánepa, Peruvian politician
Mariano Cánepa (born 1987), Argentine handball player

See also
Canepa (disambiguation)